Luciano Ramella (born April 10, 1914, in Pollone; died in Tomazina March 6, 1990) was an Italian professional football player.

Honours
 Serie A champion: 1934/35.

1914 births
1990 deaths
Italian footballers
Serie A players
Juventus F.C. players
F.C. Pro Vercelli 1892 players
S.S. Lazio players
Como 1907 players
Association football midfielders
U.S. Imperia 1923 players